U.S. Route 321 (US 321) is a spur of U.S. Route 21. It reaches its northernmost point at Elizabethton, Tennessee. Because of its unusual "north–south–north" routing, U.S. Route 321 intersects both Interstate 40 and U.S. Route 70 three separate times. The highway serves different roles in each state:  An alternate route to interstates in South Carolina, a major highway in North Carolina, and a scenic route in Tennessee.

Route description

|-
|SC
|217.2
|349.5
|-
|NC
|105.5
|169.8
|-
|TN
|194.2
|312.5
|-
|Total
|516.9
|831.8
|}

South Carolina
US 321 provides direct access between Savannah and Columbia, serving as an alternate to Interstate 95 and Interstate 26.  Starting in Hardeeville, US 321  as a mostly 2 lane highway goes through sparsely populated areas and small towns including Estill, Fairfax, and Denmark, heading in a rather straight and northward direction into the Columbia area, widening to a 5 lane highway right after Neeses, then narrowing down to a 2 lane highway right after the town of North and widening to a 5 lane highway again after Swansea and staying that way until it merges with its parent route US 21 in Dixiana.  In Columbia, the route stays concurrent with US 21 through Cayce, over the Congaree River on the Blossom Street Bridge, turning left onto Huger Street, right onto Elmwood Avenue, and left onto North Main Street.  The roads separate at Hyatt Park, with US 321 staying west of I-77 and US 21 north of Columbia.  The route goes through to communities of Winnsboro, Chester, York, and Clover before entering North Carolina at Bowling Green.

North Carolina
US 321 is an important route in Western North Carolina. It provides an alternative north–south route to I-77, which passes through a busy metropolitan area, and US 221, which is more twisty drive up the Appalachians. Travelers from South Carolina who are going to points west of Charlotte and want to avoid the traffic of I-77 may choose to enter the state on US 321.

The highway traverses through seven counties: Gaston, Lincoln, Catawba, Burke, Caldwell, Watauga, and Avery. US 321 has six control cities: Gastonia, Lincolnton, Hickory, Lenoir, Blowing Rock, and Boone.

US 321 is a multilane highway beginning at the state line. After , it enters the Gastonia area. Traffic on northbound 321 through Gastonia is generally not as heavy as traffic on southbound 321 north of I-85, where it may back up for a couple of miles as drivers wait to turn onto I-85.

The road becomes a freeway at C. Grier Beam Boulevard in Gastonia, just south of NC 275/NC 279. It remains a freeway until just north of its junction with US 70 in Hickory. The freeway bypasses a number of cities that the old US 321 route once passed through. Today, US 321 Business follows the original  route, which serves Maiden, Newton, and Conover, but the freeway is a more direct route to the mountains, and the business route is generally used by local traffic only.

Traffic is usually heavy between Hickory and Lenoir. The North Carolina Department of Transportation (NCDOT) has a long-term plan to widen the road to six lanes, which is expected to begin after 2020.

North of Lenoir, US 321 is a four-lane divided highway, continuing up the steep escarpment of the Blue Ridge Mountains. Until early 2018, the road was a narrow two-lane highway from near Patterson through Blowing Rock. Work on this area continued for much of the first two decades of the 21st century. The widening of US 321 through Blowing Rock was and continues to be seen as a controversial project. Many residents of the town felt that a four-lane highway would destroy the character of the small town, and they proposed several bypass alternatives. NCDOT selected the widening as its preferred alternative, but added several features such as underground utilities, sidewalks, landscaping, and rock walls to make the widening more palatable to the residents opposed to it. These features were not present on the two-lane highway that was replaced.  The final portion of the widening project, at the steepest part of the road just south of Blowing Rock, began in 2012 and was completed in 2018. Some landscaping work remains which will commence in Fall 2018 as its own project, constructed separately for beautification of the route through town.

North of Blowing Rock, US 321 is already a highway of four lanes up to King Street in Boone; thus, US 321 is a four-lane highway from the South Carolina state line to downtown Boone. Currently, US 321 meets US 421 at King Street and overlaps it over King Street to leave town to the west. NCDOT project R-2615 is proposed to widen the US 321/421 concurrency from this junction to their junction near Vilas, although this project is currently unfunded. There is a feasibility study (FS-0511A) in progress to examine the possibility of widening US 321 from the junction near Vilas to the Tennessee state line. If both of these projects were completed, then US 321 would be a four-lane highway through the entire state.

Tennessee

As it crosses into Tennessee, US 321 enters the Cherokee National Forest, and continues westward through the rugged valley between Pond Mountain on the south and Watauga Lake on the north.  The highway passes numerous campgrounds, boat launches, and other lake-related recreational areas as it winds its way along the shores of the lake.  South of Butler, the highway joins SR 67, which enters from the Mountain City area to the northeast.  The Appalachian Trail crosses US 321 at its intersection with Shook Gap Road, just before the highway exits the national forest.  At Hampton, US 321 intersects US 19E, and the two highways run concurrently northward into Elizabethton.

US 321 inverts directions in Elizabethton: the road is designated as southbound in both directions driving away from its intersection with US 19E. It is conterminous with US 11E through portions of Washington and Greene counties.  In Greeneville, the highway continues south into Cocke County. At the Cocke-Greene County line US 321 becomes a four-laned divided highway and bypasses Parrottsville. The four-lane section ends just before US 321's junction with SR 160 and crossing I-40 at Newport.

The stretch of US 321 from Newport south to Cosby and southwest through Pittman Center to Gatlinburg parallels the northern boundary of the Great Smoky Mountains National Park and is quite scenic. From a point between Newport and Cosby to the intersection with the Little River Road, it is concurrent with SR 73. In Pigeon Forge, concurrent with US 441/Great Smoky Mountains Parkway, US 321 is a divided, multi-lane traffic-laden thoroughfare where it serves as the city's main route, lined with hotels, outlet malls and amusement facilities. Veering southwest of Pigeon Forge, the highway takes on a more rural character as it traverses Wears Valley, and narrows down to two lanes until its junction with SR 73 Scenic (the Little River Road) at the Townsend entrance to the park. It is concurrent with SR 73 from this junction to its terminus. With the exception of a  section between Townsend and Maryville, the remaining portions of the highway through Blount County are a minimum of four lanes and usually a divided highway. Once the highway reaches Fort Loudon Dam in Loudon County, it crosses the Tennessee River via a bridge, completed in 2017, southeast of the dam then intersects with US 11 in Lenoir City. US 321 has a wrong-way concurrency with SR 95 from a point several miles south of Lenoir City (near Greenback) to its terminus at I-40.  In the northern part of Lenoir City, US 321 intersects I-75 and US 70 before reaching I-40.  Beyond I-40, the road continues northward to Oak Ridge as the two-lane SR 95.

US 321 is a four-lane semi-divided thoroughfare from I-40 and I-75 to the Great Smoky Mountains National Park, except for the  stretch near Walland.

History

North Carolina Highway 17

North Carolina Highway 17 (NC 17) was an original state highway that traversed from Hickory to Boone, through Granite Falls, Hudson, Lenoir and Blowing Rock. In 1930, it was extended south on new primary routing to NC 113, in Propst Crossroads; also same year, US 321 was established in the state and overlapped NC 17 between Hickory and Boone.  In 1934, NC 17 was decommissioned, with US 321 taking all north of Hickory and NC 96 taking all south.

North Carolina Highway 155

North Carolina Highway 155 (NC 155) was established in 1994 following the old alignment of US 321 as it was moved onto new four-lane controlled-access highway.  From NC 275/NC 279, in Dallas, it traversed north through High Shoals to Lincolnton.  Sharing a short concurrency with NC 150 as it bypass the downtown area of Lincolnton, it continues north meeting with main US 321, south of Maiden, continuing in concurrency through Newton and finally Conover, where it ended at US 70.  In 1999, the remainder of US 321 was moved onto new freeway bypass west of Newton and Conover; at same time, NC 155 was decommissioned and absorbed into US 321 Business.

North Carolina Highway 603

Future
In addition to the widening project, .  Currently, US 321 is a surface road at the I-85 interchange, and is a limited access freeway a few hundred yards north.  To extend the freeway to I-85, the remaining at-grade intersections and traffic lights would have to be eliminated.

Major intersections

Special routes

Winnsboro business loop

U.S. Route 321 Business (US 321 Bus.) is a  business route of US 321 that exists in Winnsboro Mills and Winnsboro, via Columbia Road and Congress Street. It was established around 1951 or 1952, when mainline US 321 was rerouted west, bypassing Winnsboro.

Chester business loop

U.S. Route 321 Business (US 321 Bus.) is a  business route of US 321 in the city of Chester. It traverses downtown Chester, via Columbia Street and Center Road. It was established between 1962 and 1964, when mainline US 321 was rerouted west, bypassing Chester.

York business loop

U.S. Route 321 Business (US 321 Bus.) is a  business route of US 321 in the city of York, utilizing Congress Street and Kings Mountain Street. It was established around 1957–1958, when mainline US 321 was rerouted west, bypassing York.

Dallas–Hickory business loop

U.S. Route 321 Business (US 321 Bus) was established in June 1999, as a renumbering all of NC 155 and part of mainline US 321 in Catawba County.  Traversing  through Gaston, Lincoln and Catawba counties, it connects the cities and towns of Dallas, High Shoals, Lincolnton, Maiden, Newton, Conover and Hickory.  The highway follows the original US 321 routing through that existed prior to 1994.

Lincolnton alternate route

U.S. Route 321 Alternate (US 321A) was established 1956 when mainline US 321 was placed on new bypass east of downtown Lincolnton.  It traversed along Aspen Street and around the Lincoln County Civil Court on Court Square Drive.  In 1960 it was decommissioned, with Aspen Street becoming secondary roads.

Granite Falls–Lenoir alternate route

U.S. Route 321 Alternate (US 321A) was established 1948 as a number swap with US 321 through downtown Lenoir.  In 1957, US 321A was extended south, replacing mainline US 321 through Granite Falls and Hudson, ending at its current southern terminus north of the Catawba River.  In June 1964, US 321A was placed on one-way splits through downtown Lenoir; northbound continued along Mulberry Street and West Avenue, southbound rerouted along Main Street and College Avenue.  In September 2006, US 321A was rerouted to its current northern terminus, just south of downtown Lenoir, via McLean Drive.  Its old alignment through downtown Lenoir was carried on by NC 90 until 2012, when it too was rerouted; the old alignment is now under city control.

Traversing through Granite Falls, Sawmills, Hudson and Lenoir US 321A has not changed much over the years. Predominantly a two-lane highway, it parallels a short line railroad and connects to several factories and downtowns.

Lenoir alternate route

U.S. Route 321 Alternate (US 321A) was established 1941 as a new alternate route bypassing Lenoir.  In 1948, it was replaced by mainline US 321.

Blowing Rock business loop

U.S. Route 321 Business (US 321 Bus) was established 1960 as an upgrade to secondary roads through downtown Blowing Rock; which were originally part of mainline US 321 until about 1954, when it was moved onto a new bypass east.

Boone truck route

U.S. Route 321 Truck (US 321 Truck) redirects truckers traveling through the area to go south and around downtown Boone, via NC 105 and NC Highway 105 Bypass (SR-1107).  The shares some overlap with US 221 Truck and complete overlap with US 421 Truck.

Greeneville truck route

U.S. Route 321 Truck (US 321 Truck) redirects truckers traveling south on US 321 around downtown. It shares a concurrency with US 11E and SR 70. The route begins at US 11E/US 321 and ends  later at US 321/SR 70.

See also

References

 "U.S. 321 widening to take longer than estimated" by Andrew Mackie, Hickory Daily Record, March 14, 2006

External links

 Mapmikey's South Carolina Highways Page: U.S. Route 321
 NCRoads.com: U.S. Route 321
 NCRoads.com: U.S. Route 321-A
 NCRoads.com: U.S. Route 321 Business
 Endpoints of U.S. Highway 321

21-3
21-3
21-3
21-3
3
Transportation in Jasper County, South Carolina
Transportation in Hampton County, South Carolina
Transportation in Bamberg County, South Carolina
Transportation in Orangeburg County, South Carolina
Transportation in Lexington County, South Carolina
Transportation in Richland County, South Carolina
Transportation in Fairfield County, South Carolina
Transportation in Chester County, South Carolina
Transportation in York County, South Carolina
Transportation in Gaston County, North Carolina
Transportation in Lincoln County, North Carolina
Transportation in Catawba County, North Carolina
Transportation in Burke County, North Carolina
Transportation in Caldwell County, North Carolina
Transportation in Watauga County, North Carolina
Transportation in Avery County, North Carolina
Transportation in Johnson County, Tennessee
Transportation in Carter County, Tennessee
Transportation in Washington County, Tennessee
Transportation in Greene County, Tennessee
Transportation in Cocke County, Tennessee
Transportation in Sevier County, Tennessee
Transportation in Blount County, Tennessee
Transportation in Loudon County, Tennessee